Joshua Mitts is an American legal scholar. He is associate professor of law and Milton Handler Fellow at Columbia Law School. He is known for his research into short activism and its alleged market abuses.

Biography 
Mitts received his B.A. from Georgetown University in 2010, J.D. from Yale Law School, and Ph.D. from Columbia Business School in 2018.

He joined the Columbia Law School faculty in 2017. In 2022, Mitts became the center of media attention after having published a number of analyses on trading data as well as the online presence of short sellers and suggested that certain players were manipulating the market. Mitt used extensive data he gathered online to point to potentially manipulative and illicit trading activities and alleged securities fraud by investors.

Mitts' work has become influential in guiding ongoing federal probes into certain activist short sellers and hedge funds such as Muddy Waters Research that publish negative reports on certain companies to lower their stock.

Mitts also argued that the GameStop short squeeze was case of traders banding together to take down hedge funds.

References 

Living people
Georgetown University alumni
Yale Law School alumni
Columbia Business School alumni
Columbia Law School faculty
Year of birth missing (living people)